Braulio Robinson Medrano Castillo (born May 13, 1968) is a Dominican former professional baseball outfielder, who played in Major League Baseball (MLB) with the Philadelphia Phillies. He batted and threw right-handed.

Baseball career
Signed by the Los Angeles Dodgers as an amateur free agent in 1985, Castillo was traded to the Phillies, in exchange for relief pitcher Roger McDowell, on July 31, 1991. He made his big league debut with the Phillies, on August 18, 1991, and appeared in his final game on October 4, 1992.

External links

Braulio Castillo at Baseball Almanac

1968 births
Living people
Acereros de Monclova players
Bakersfield Dodgers players
Broncos de Reynosa players
Colorado Springs Sky Sox players
Dominican Republic expatriate baseball players in Mexico
Dominican Republic expatriate baseball players in the United States
El Paso Diablos players
Gulf Coast Dodgers players

Major League Baseball center fielders
Major League Baseball outfielders
Major League Baseball players from the Dominican Republic
Olmecas de Tabasco players
Osceola Astros players
People from Elías Piña Province
Philadelphia Phillies players
Rio Grande Valley WhiteWings players
Salem Dodgers players
San Antonio Missions players
Scranton/Wilkes-Barre Red Barons players
Tucson Toros players
Vero Beach Dodgers players